Irakli Tskhadadze is a Georgian rugby union player and member of the Georgian national rugby team.

He played as Flanker for Bordeaux and Brive in the Top 14.

Irakli currently plays for Soyaux Angoulême XV.

References

External links
Profile at itsrugby.fr

1996 births
Living people
Rugby union players from Georgia (country)
Georgia international rugby union players
Rugby union flankers